State Road 231 (SR 231), locally known as Dr. Martin Luther King Jr. Avenue and SW 6th Avenue, is a north-south discontinuous route running through Union County, Bradford County, and Alachua County, Florida.

Route description
State Road 231 begins near LaCrosse at the intersection with SR 235 and County Road 231 (former SR 231). From there it heads north, cosigning with SR 235, across the Santa Fe River into Bradford County and Brooker. At the junction with SR 18, state maintenance ends and the road becomes County Road 231, with County Road 235 cosigning. The route continues north into Union County, passing CR 231A, and regains state road status near SW 78th Street and the Florida Department of Corrections Reception and Medical Center. The road then heads into Lake Butler, crossing SR 121 and ending at SR 238 several blocks short of SR 100.

History
The former relinquished segment is signed as County Road 231.

A second piece of CR 231 fills the gap in SR 231 between Brooker and south of Lake Butler. East of Brooker is a third piece looping south off County Road 18 that does not line up with the others, yet was also once known as SR 231.

A final piece begins at SR 100 northwest of Lake Butler and extends north to Olustee, where it crosses US 90 before ending at the shore of Ocean Pond in the Osceola National Forest.

Major intersections

References

231
231
231
231
231
231
231
231